Patole is a village in Sinnar taluka of Nashik district in the Indian state of Maharashtra. The current sarpanch of Patole is Shri Meghraj Suresh Avhad who is a civil engineer.

NOTABLE_PERSON*

Pandurang Maharaj Patolekar

Pandurang Maharaj Avhad born in this village and he his Popular kirtankar in Maharashtra. Kirtan " is an art of spiritual teaching through story-telling. It is typically performed by one or two main performers, called Keertankar, accompanied by Harmonium and Tabla musicians. It involves singing, acting, dancing, and story-telling, However it is unlike any other performing art as it is basically pure glorification of god and godly acts.

Ravindra Dnyaneshwar Khatale
First IAS officer in this village.

Geography
Patole is one of the major commercial villages in Sinnar taluka. By road, it lies nine kilometers south of Sinnar city.

Demographics
In the 2011 Indian census, Patole had a population of 2,714. Males constituted 51.1% of the population and females 48.9%. Patole had an average literacy rate of 85.38%, higher than the national average of 59.5%, with male literacy at 93.1%, and female literacy at 77.4%. In 2011 approximately 10% of the population was aged six or below.

References 

Villages in Nashik district